Nuestra Belleza Oaxaca 2010,  was held in Hotel Barceló, Huatulco, Oaxaca on May 22, 2010. At the conclusion of the final night of competition, Alejandra Scheremberg of the capital city Oaxaca was crowned the winner. Scheremberg  was crowned by outgoing Nuestra Belleza Oaxaca titleholder, Denise Mendiola. Six contestants competed for the state title.

Results

Placements

Contestants

Contestants Notes
Mariana Mejía also she was Suplente/1st Runner-up in Nuestra Belleza Oaxaca 2011. She was elected as Miss Earth Oaxaca 2011 in a private casting with expectations to participate in Miss Earth México 2011 but for different reasons she will not compete, taking place Alejandra Sandoval Villaseñor.

References

External links
Official Website

Nuestra Belleza México